Sonia Viérin (born 25 October 1977 in Aosta) is an Italian former alpine skier who competed in the 2002 Winter Olympics.

Her mother Roselda Joux (born 1950) and her nephew Sophie Mathiou (born 2002) are world-class Alpine skiers as well.

References

External links
 

1977 births
Living people
Italian female alpine skiers
Olympic alpine skiers of Italy
Alpine skiers at the 2002 Winter Olympics
People from Aosta
Alpine skiers of Fiamme Gialle
Sportspeople from Aosta Valley